Mahalia Melts in the Rain is a Canadian short drama film, directed by Émilie Mannering and Carmine Pierre-Dufour and released in 2018.

The film stars Kaiyonni Banton-Renner as Mahalia, a young Black Canadian girl who feels self-conscious about her African-Canadian hair setting her apart from her classmates at ballet school, leading her mother Anika (Sagine Sémajuste) to take her to a hair salon to get her hair straightened.

The film premiered at the 2018 Vancouver International Film Festival. At the 7th Canadian Screen Awards in 2019, the film was shortlisted for Best Live Action Short Drama.

It subsequently won the 2020 edition of CBC Television's annual Short Film Face-Off competition.

References

External links 
 

2018 short films
2018 drama films
Black Canadian films
2018 films
2010s English-language films
Canadian drama short films
2010s Canadian films